Generation is the second studio album by the electronic music group Audio Bullys, released on 31 October 2005. It features the singles "Shot You Down", which reached number 3 on the UK Singles Chart, and "I'm in Love" (released 24 October 2005).

Two Promo versions of the album were released on CD by Source/EMI. One of these (CDSOURDJ107) features a different track order, a different shorter mix of I Won't Let You Down, and 3 extra tracks that were pulled before the final album release.

Track listing

Samples
 "Shot You Down" is based around a sample of the Nancy Sinatra's Bang Bang (My Baby Shot Me Down) 
 "Made Like That" uses sample from Bill Conti's "Going the Distance"  
 "Keep on Moving" samples Steely Dan's "Midnite Cruiser" 
 "Take You There" uses a sample from Dr. Hook & the Medicine Show's "In Over My Head".

Chart positions

References

2005 albums
Astralwerks albums
Audio Bullys albums